"Wor Peg's Trip te Tynemouth" (sub-titled "A Reglor Cawshun") is a Geordie folk song written in the 19th century by Joe Wilson, in a style deriving from music hall.

This song tells a friendly, warm-hearted story about a day on the beach. It includes a reference to the new idea of “bathing machines” (In tiv a fine masheen she ran).

Lyrics 

The song appears in the “Tyneside Songs” chapbook. The cover has a patterned border and written on it is:- 
“The Canny Newcassel foaks fireside budjit Joe Wilson’s Tyneside Songs, Ballads and Drolleries. Part 1, price sixpence. Entered at Stationers Hall. Original Fireside Pictors, Draws i’ wor awn awd canny toon style, By Joe Wilson. And sung by him with immense success at the “Tyne” and “Oxford” Music Halls, Newcastle. Printed by Joe Wilson.” 
And vertically at either side of a central picture is
“Copyright. Deddycated to tiv iverybody. Full o’ fun, drols, wisdom an’ sittera".
It is not known exactly when the book was published, but we can estimate that it was sometime between 1865 and 1869:

See also
Geordie dialect words

References 

English folk songs
Songs related to Newcastle upon Tyne
19th-century songs
Northumbrian folklore
Year of song unknown